The 2016 Hong Kong Asian Sevens was the first leg of the Asian Rugby Sevens Series for the year. It was held at the Hong Kong Football Club Stadium

Hong Kong won the opening leg of the series after they defeated Sri Lanka 22–17 to lead the series.

Pool Stage

Pool A

Pool B

Knockout stage

Plate

Cup

References

2016 Asian Seven Series
rugby union
International rugby union competitions hosted by Hong Kong